Coolhull Castle is a fortified house and National Monument located in County Wexford, Ireland.

Location

History

There are no historical references to Coolhull Castle although it is known that a John Devereux owned land at Coolhull in 1640.

Building

Coolhull Castle has a four-storey service tower and three-storey rectangular block (hall house) attached with a hall at first-floor level. Both sections have Irish crenellations. There is a bartizan in the northeast. The tower doorway is protected by a murder-hole. Other features include fireplaces, garderobe and slop stone.

References

National Monuments in County Wexford
Castles in County Wexford